Lightship No. 29 FLADEN is a former lightvessel which is now a museum ship moored at the Maritiman maritime museum on Göta Älv  in  Gothenburg, Sweden.

Fladen  was built in 1929 at Bergsunds Mekaniska Verkstad in Stockholm. 
She was employed at  Hävringe in the Oxelösund archipelago and at Öland reef before receiving her last assignment on the Halland coast between 1966 and 1969. She was replaced in 1969 by an anchored buoy.

Gallery

References

Other sources
Björn Werner (1999)  Fyrskepp i Sverige  (Falkenberg: C B Marinlitteratur AB) 

Lightships
Museum ships in Sweden
Museums in Gothenburg
1915 ships

de:Fladen grund#Feuerschiff
sv:Fladen grund#Fyrskepp